Will Bunch is an American journalist. He is a writer for the Philadelphia Daily News, and columnist for the Philadelphia Inquirer. He won a  1992 Pulitzer Prize for spot news reporting.

Works 

 Tear Down This Myth: The Right-Wing Distortion of the Reagan Legacy
 The Backlash: Right-Wing Radicals, High-Def Hucksters and Paranoid Politics in the Age of Obama.
 After the Ivory Tower Falls: How College Broke the American Dream and Blew Up Our Politics

References

External links 

 Best Of: Women In Afghanistan / How College Broke The American Dream Fresh Air August 13, 2022

American journalists
Year of birth missing (living people)
Living people